Caliprobola speciosa is a Palearctic hoverfly. It is an ancient woodland bioindicator.

Description
For terms see Morphology of Diptera
Caliprobola speciosa is a  large (wingspan : 13–17 mm. slender -bodied hoverfly. The body is brassy aeneous or dark metallic green. The base of the abdomen is black. Tergites 2, 3 and 4 have  a thin black transverse line followed by a broad metallic green band, a thin black transverse line broken in the middle and a transverse stripe of golden hairs.  The prominent orange yellow frons is projecting  and coned. The face is yellow. The legs are yellow, only the base of the femora black. The wings are yellowish and dark shaded at the tip. The larva is described and figured by Rotheray  (1994)

Distribution
Europe, from southern England to northern Spain and across the Palearctic as far as eastern Siberia.Not in Scandinavia and northern regions.

Biology
The habitat is Quercus and Fagus and Castanea ancient woodland where the larvae develop in decaying stumps. Flowers visited are white umbellifers, Caltha, Crataegus, Rorippa, Rubus, Sorbus aucuparia, Tamarix. Adults fly from mid May to mid July.

References

External links
 Images representing Calliprobola speciosa 

Diptera of Europe
Eristalinae
Insects described in 1790
Taxa named by Pietro Rossi